Events in the year 2021 in Malaysia.

Federal level 
 Yang di-Pertuan Agong: Al-Sultan Abdullah of Pahang
 Raja Permaisuri Agong: Tunku Azizah of Pahang
 Deputy Yang di-Pertuan Agong: Sultan Nazrin Shah of Perak
 Prime Minister: 
Tan Sri Muhyiddin Yassin (until 21 August)
Dato' Seri Ismail Sabri Yaakob (from 21 August)
 Deputy Prime Minister: Dato' Seri Ismail Sabri Yaakob (from 7 July until 16 August)
 Chief Justice: Tengku Maimun Tuan Mat

State level 
  :
Sultan of Johor: Sultan Ibrahim Ismail
 Menteri Besar of Johor: Hasni Mohammad
  :
 Sultan of Kedah: Sultan Sallehuddin
 Menteri Besar of Kedah: Muhammad Sanusi Md Nor
  :
 Sultan of Kelantan: Sultan Muhammad V 
 Menteri Besar of Kelantan: Ahmad Yaakob
  :
 Raja of Perlis: Tuanku Syed Sirajuddin
 Menteri Besar of Perlis: Azlan Man
  :
 Sultan of Perak: Sultan Nazrin Shah
 Menteri Besar of Perak: Saarani Mohamad
  :
 Sultan of Pahang: Sultan Abdullah Al Haj 
 Menteri Besar of Pahang: Wan Rosdy Wan Ismail
  :
 Sultan of Selangor: Sultan Sharafuddin Idris Shah
 Menteri Besar of Selangor: Amirudin Shari
  :
 Sultan of Terengganu: Sultan Mizan Zainal Abidin
 Menteri Besar of Terengganu: Ahmad Samsuri Mokhtar
  :
 Yang di-Pertuan Besar of Negeri Sembilan: Tuanku Muhriz
 Menteri Besar of Negeri Sembilan: Aminuddin Harun
  :
 Yang di-Pertua Negeri of Penang: 
Abdul Rahman Abbas (until 30 April) 
Ahmad Fuzi Abdul Razak (from 1 May) 
 Chief Minister of Penang: Chow Kon Yeow
  :
 Yang di-Pertua Negeri of Malacca: Mohd Ali Rustam
 Chief Minister of Malacca: Sulaiman Md Ali
  :
 Yang di-Pertua Negeri of Sarawak: Abdul Taib Mahmud
 Chief Minister of Sarawak: Abang Johari Openg
  :
 Yang di-Pertua Negeri of Sabah: Juhar Mahiruddin
 Chief Minister of Sabah: Hajiji Noor

Events

January
 1 January 
The Kuala Lumpur–Singapore high-speed rail project is terminated after failing to reach an agreement on 31 December the previous year.
Senior Minister Ismail Sabri Yaakob announces that the Recovery Movement Control Order is extended until 31 March 2021 as cases remain high.
 2 January 
Nine drowned after 4WD vehicle rolled off ferry in Triso, Sarawak.
 3 January 
2020-21 Malaysian floods
Heavy rain in Pahang and Johor, causing several flooding.
Flooding at East Coast Expressway Phase 1 disrupts road travel in east coast.
 4 January 
2020-21 Malaysian floods
 Floods occurred in 6 states, particularly in east coast region, more than 20,000 victims were evacuated.
Floods in Pahang has claimed first lives: a father has drowned and his son is lost.
Floods in Johor has claimed second victim after 20-year-old man's car swept away by strong currents.
Nora Anne Quoirin died by misadventure, coroner rules.
5 January
Annuar Musa is sacked as BN and UMNO secretary-general.
The Civil Aviation Authority of Malaysia suspends My Heli Club license for 6 months.
6 January
COVID-19 pandemic in Malaysia
85% of Malaysia's hospital beds for COVID-19 patients filled, as new daily cases hit high.
7 January 
COVID-19 pandemic in Malaysia
Malaysia records the highest COVID-19 tally in a day with 3,027 cases.
RoS rejects applications from Homeland Fighters' Party to be registered as political party.
Malaysian United Democratic Alliance (MUDA) confirms RoS rejects application to register as party.
8 January
2020-21 Malaysian floods
Floods in Maran reported to be the worst in 20 years.
Flood situation worsens, almost 50,000 evacuated.
A petrol bomb was thrown at KWSP office in Miri, Sarawak. No deaths and injuries reported.
COVID-19 pandemic in Malaysia
Malaysia records the highest COVID-19 deaths tally with 16 fatalities.
 9 January
COVID-19 pandemic in Malaysia
Member of Kelantan State Legislative Assembly Abd Aziz Yusoff and Gua Musang Youth UMNO chief were tested positive for COVID-19.
 10 January
COVID-19 pandemic in Malaysia
 Sabah Agriculture and Fisheries Assistant Minister Hendrus Anding tested positive for COVID-19, joining Deputy Chief Minister Jeffrey Kitingan and Bingkor state assemblyman Robert Tawik on the list of those infected.
 PMD Minister Mustapa Mohamed tests positive for COVID-19.
11 January
COVID-19 pandemic in Malaysia
Women, Family and Community Development Minister Rina Harun tests positive for COVID-19.
Member of Kelantan State Legislative Assembly Mohd Syahbuddin Hashim and his wife were tested positive for COVID-19.
Ministry of Health and Pfizer sign manufacturing and supply agreement for COVID-19 vaccines.
Only 5 COVID-19 green zones in Peninsular Malaysia.
Prime Minister Muhyiddin Yassin announces new MCO starting on 13 January on the federal territories and five states.
 12 January 
COVID-19 pandemic in Malaysia
Yang di-Pertuan Agong Al-Sultan Abdullah declares state of emergency to curb the spread of COVID-19.
Home Affairs Minister Hamzah Zainuddin tests positive for COVID-19.
Malaysia records the highest COVID-19 tally in a day with 3,309 cases.
 13 January 
Fire at Andaman Hotel in Langkawi brought under control.
COVID-19 pandemic in Malaysia
Communications and Multimedia Deputy Minister Zahidi Zainul Abidin tests positive for COVID-19.
14 January
2020-21 Malaysian floods
More than 1800 flood victims in Sarawak were evacuated as of 1pm this afternoon.
COVID-19 pandemic in Malaysia
Gua Musang MP Tengku Razaleigh Hamzah tests positive for COVID-19.
Malaysia records the highest COVID-19 tally in a day with 3,337 cases.
Former chief justice Salleh Abas tests positive for COVID-19.
Senator Yaakob Sapari tests positive for COVID-19.
15 January
COVID-19 pandemic in Malaysia
Malaysia records 3,211 new cases, 1,710 recoveries, eight deaths.
Langkawi-Kuala Perlis ferry services suspended.
Sultan Ibrahim agrees to rename 'Johor Cricket Academy Oval' in Mutiara Rini to 'Dato' Dr Harjit Singh Johor Cricket Academy Oval 'in conjunction with the late Dr Harjit.
2020-21 Malaysian floods
4,222 victims were evacuated in Sarawak.
16 January
COVID-19 pandemic in Malaysia
Senator Idris Ahmad tests positive for COVID-19.
Malaysia records the highest COVID-19 tally in a day with 4,029 cases.
18 January
Prime Minister Muhyiddin Yassin announce new RM15 billion Permai stimulus package.
19 January
COVID-19 pandemic in Malaysia
Padang Rengas MP Mohamed Nazri Abdul Aziz tests positive for COVID-19.
National Unity Minister Halimah Mohamed Sadique tests positive for COVID-19.
Former Menteri Besar Terengganu Ahmad Said and his wife test positive for COVID-19.
20 January
COVID-19 pandemic in Malaysia
Pasir Salak MP Tajuddin Abdul Rahman tests positive for COVID-19.
Cosmetics entrepreneur Nur Sajat pleads not guilty to cross-dressing.
Selangor announces RM73.87 mil aid package.
23 January
COVID-19 pandemic in Malaysia
Terengganu Pas Commissioner tests positive for COVID-19.
24 January
COVID-19 pandemic in Malaysia
1 ERL employee tests positive for COVID-19.
Malaysians are among the 7 experts selected as members of the leading health bodies in Japan.
Aaron - Wooi Yik advanced to the Thai Open final.
25 January 
COVID-19 pandemic in Malaysia
EMCO in Taiping Prison & Staff Quarters.
AGC objects to MUDA's application to challenge RoS' decision to reject its registration.
26 January
Long-distance married couples allowed interstate travel from tomorrow.
Educational TV program starting January 27.
29 January 
COVID-19 pandemic in Malaysia
Malaysia records the highest COVID-19 tally in a day with 5,725 cases.
30 January 
COVID-19 pandemic in Malaysia
Malaysia records the highest COVID-19 tally in a day with 5,728 cases.

February
1 February
COVID-19 pandemic in Malaysia
Sri Ledang PLKN Camp will be the second PKRC in Johor.
2 February
Squash player Datuk Nicol David is named Greatest Athlete of All Time in The World.
COVID-19 pandemic in Malaysia
 MCO continues till 18 February.
3 February
Isa Samad is sentenced to six years jail, fined RM15.4mil for graft.
11 February
Gerakan joins Perikatan Nasional.
17 February
NTV7 temporarily ceases operation to give way for DidikTV.
50 residents in the Pasir Mas town area were evacuated following a landslide.
COVID-19 pandemic in Malaysia
Malaysia to receive Alpha ventilators worth RM2 million.
2,720 COVID-19 cases, record high 5,718 discharged.
18 February
Pahang government allocates RM9.4 million for 18,726 flood victims.
High Court orders Rosmah Mansor to enter defence on all three graft charges.
21 February
COVID-19 pandemic in Malaysia
First COVID-19 Vaccines arrived at KLIA.
 Kuantan was officially declared as a city by Sultan Abdullah.
24 February 
COVID-19 pandemic in Malaysia
Muhyiddin Yassin and DG Hisham receives first dose of COVID-19 Vaccine.
26 February 
COVID-19 pandemic in Malaysia
Minister of defense Ismail Sabri Yaakob receives COVID-19 vaccine.
Sarawak CM Abang Abdul Rahman Johari Abang Openg receives the first COVID-19 vaccines in Sarawak.
27 February 
COVID-19 pandemic in Malaysia
Sinovac Vaccines arrived.
New US ambassador Brian D. McFeeters arrives in Malaysia.
28 February
COVID-19 pandemic in Malaysia
Penang Chief Minister and Kedah Menteri Besar received COVID-19 Vaccine.
2020–21 Malaysian political crisis
Two members of parliament from the opposition pledge to support Muhyiddin Yassin.
Prime Minister launch 'Pelan Pemerkasaan Kepimpinan Komuniti Rukun Tetangga'.

March
10 March
Muhyiddin Yassin arrived in Abu Dhabi for a 2-day official visit.
High Court rules use of word Allah by non-Muslims allowed.
16 March
CMCO in Kedah, Perak and Negeri Sembilan was changed to RMCO.
Malaysia signs the Convention of the International Association of Marine Assistance for Navigation.

April
 1 April - State broadcaster Radio Televisyen Malaysia (RTM) celebrates its 75th anniversary, launching its new logo and sports channel and rebranding all of its local radio stations.
 5 April - Malaysia's Court of Appeal began hearing a bid by former Prime Minister Najib Razak to set aside his conviction on corruption charges in a case linked to a multi-billion dollar scandal at state fund 1MDB.
 6 April - Najib Razak has been served with a bankruptcy notice following his failure to pay the RM1.69 billion in additional income tax arrears to the Inland Revenue Board (IRB).

May
 5 May - Government imposes tighter restrictions after rise of COVID-19 cases in Kuala Lumpur.
 7 May - Malaysia bans travelers from Pakistan, Bangladesh, Sri Lanka and Nepal due to soaring number of COVID-19 cases in the region.
 10 May - Nationwide travel ban as COVID-19 cases soar.
12 May - Nationwide MCO reintroduced for the third time.
 18 May - Najib Razak's appeal hearing against his conviction and jail sentence for misappropriation of RM42mil in SRC International Sdn Bhd's funds at the Court of Appeal was completed after the court heard the arguments from both parties for 15 days.
 24 May 
The 1Malaysia Development Berhad (1MDB) trial involving Najib Razak was postponed after the former prime minister developed hematoma from his eye surgery.
2 LRT trains collide near KLCC station, resulting in 213 people being injured.
28 May - Prime Minister Muhyiddin Yassin announced that a nationwide "total lockdown" will be imposed on all social and economic sectors in Malaysia from 1 June to 14 June 2021.

June
 1 June - The first phase of the total lockdown began.
 11 June - Malaysia extends the "total lockdown" for another two weeks until 28 June due to a high number of cases.
 15 June - Prime Minister Muhyiddin Yassin unveils a four-stage National Recovery Plan with full reopening projected by November.
 16 June - The Yang di-Pertuan Agong Al-Sultan Abdullah advised the Parliament to reconvene as soon as possible.
 27 June - Malaysia extends "total lockdown" indefinitely until daily cases drop below 4,000 and targets on vaccination and intensive care unit usage are met.

July
 7 July - Ismail Sabri Yaakob becomes Malaysia's Deputy Prime Minister.
 8 July 
 2020–21 Malaysian political crisis
UMNO withdraws support for Muhyiddin, calling for a new Prime Minister until elections can be called. Later that day, Attorney General Idrus Harun said that Muhyiddin and his Cabinet can still exercise power as no clear evidence is shown that the team lost the majority.
Former Prime Minister Mahathir Mohamad reveals that the Homeland Fighters' Party is successfully registered, days after the Court ordered the Minister of Home Affairs Hamzah Zainudin to make a decision.
 14 July 
 2020–21 Malaysian political crisis
The Cabinet declares full support for Muhyiddin a week after UMNO's withdrawal.
 23 July – 8 August – Athletes from Malaysia competed at the 2020 Summer Olympics in Tokyo, Japan, which was postponed by a year due to COVID-19.
 26 July - De facto Law Minister Takiyuddin Hassan announced that the state of emergency will not be extended with all laws revoked as of 21 July, raising questions about the legality of the actions.
 29 July - The Yang di-Pertuan Agong Al-Sultan Abdullah issued a rebuke on the revocation of the state of emergency without consent and said that MPs were misled about it. As a result, opposition leader Anwar Ibrahim filed a motion of no confidence with Prime Minister Muhyiddin Yassin defending the procedures as in line with the Constitution.
 31 July - 
A state of emergency is extended until 2 February 2022 in Sarawak to stop polls from taking place due to COVID-19.
Protests take place in Kuala Lumpur to demand Muhyiddin's resignation.
 31 July – 2020 Summer Olympics in Tokyo, Japan:
 Malaysian men's doubles, Aaron Chia and Soh Wooi Yik win bronze medal.

August
 1 August - The state of emergency ends in all states except Sarawak.
 2 August
 2020–21 Malaysian political crisis
Opposition members of the Dewan Rakyat gathered at Merdeka Square, calling for Muhyiddin's resignation while protesting the postponement of Parliament. This comes after members were blocked from entering Parliament by the police.
Media Prima Berhad rebrands its radio stations with Kool FM and One FM rebranded to Buletin FM and 8FM respectively, while Fly FM and Hot FM remain unchanged. A new audio brand Audio+ is also launched with Ripple now known as Media Prima Audio.
 3 August 
 2020–21 Malaysian political crisis
UMNO president Ahmad Zahid Hamidi and 10 MPs announce withdrawal of support for Muhyiddin as Prime Minister. Earlier that day, Minister of Energy and Natural Resources Shamsul Anuar Nasarah announced his resignation.
Muhyiddin announced that a motion to repeal the emergency laws will be done next month given that the repeal procedure was incomplete.
 4 August 
 2020–21 Malaysian political crisis
Muhyiddin announced that he will prove his majority next month with resignation not on the cards. The opposition has rejected those assertions. Several days later, the confidence motion is scheduled on 7 September.
 6 August 
 2020–21 Malaysian political crisis
Minister of Higher Education Noraini Ahmad announced her resignation. Separately, 31 Barisan Nasional members have pledged support for the Perikatan Nasional government until its legitimacy is proven in Parliament.
 8 August – 2020 Summer Olympics in Tokyo, Japan:
 Malaysian cyclist, Azizulhasni Awang win his first silver medal in track cycling.
 8 August – 2020 Summer Olympics in Tokyo, Japan officially ends with Malaysia getting 1 silver and 1 bronze medals.
 13 August 
A shooting took place at the Royal Malaysian Air Force camp in Kota Samarahan, Sarawak, killing four personnel including the shooter.
 2020–21 Malaysian political crisis
Muhyiddin announced a series of concessions to pass a confidence motion by two-thirds, including two term limits for the Prime Minister, introducing an anti-party hopping bill in Parliament, balanced parliamentary committees, allowing 18-year-olds to vote, a general election by July 2022, among others. The proposals are rejected by several parties.
 16 August 
 2020–21 Malaysian political crisis
Prime Minister Muhyiddin Yassin and his cabinet resign, will remain as caretaker prime minister before new PM is appointed.
 20 August
 2020-21 Malaysian political crisis
Conference of Rulers met to discuss the appointment of new and 9th Prime Minister. After it, Vice-President of the United Malays National Organisation (UMNO) and Member of Parliament for Bera Ismail Sabri Yaakob was announced by Istana Negara through a statement as the new and 9th PM.
 21 August
 2020-21 Malaysian political crisis
Ismail Sabri Yaakob is sworn in as the 9th Prime Minister at Istana Negara at 2.30 pm and officially marks the start of his term as PM and the end of Muhyiddin Yassin's term as caretaker PM.
 24 August – 5 September – Athletes from Malaysia competed at the 2020 Summer Paralympics in Tokyo, Japan, which was also postponed by a year due to COVID-19.
 28 August – The 2020 Summer Paralympics in Tokyo, Japan:
 Bonnie Bunyau Gustin wins first gold medal for Malaysia in the Men's 72 kg Powerlifting.
 30 August – The 2020 Summer Paralympics in Tokyo, Japan:
 Jong Yee Khie wins first silver medal for Malaysia in the Men's 107 kg Powerlifting.
 27 August 
 2020-21 Malaysian political crisis
Prime Minister Ismail Sabri Yaakob formed his first cabinet with most of them retained from the previous cabinet. The swearing-in took place 3 days later at 2.30 pm.

September
 1 September – The 2020 Summer Paralympics in Tokyo, Japan:
 Chew Wei Lun wins second silver medal for Malaysia in the Mixed individual BC1 in Boccia.
 4 September – The 2020 Summer Paralympics in Tokyo, Japan:
 Cheah Liek Hou wins the second gold medal for Malaysia in the Men's Singles SU5 in Badminton, while Abdul Latif Romly wins third gold medal for Malaysia in the Men's Long jump T20 in Athletics.
 5 September – 2020 Summer Paralympics in Tokyo, Japan officially ends with Malaysia getting 3 gold and 2 silver medals.
 9 September – In a landmark ruling, the Kuala Lumpur High Court rules that Malaysian mums with a foreign spouse can now automatically pass Malaysian citizenship to children born outside Malaysia, saying that the law on citizenship must be read with Article 8 of the Constitution; which prohibits gender discrimination. The Government appeals the ruling four days later.
 10 September
 2020-21 Malaysian political crisis
The cabinet agreed to implement key reforms to parliamentary and governmental reforms. The opposition announced its acceptance the following day.
 12 September
 2020-21 Malaysian political crisis
The government and opposition reach an agreement to sign a Memorandum of Understanding (MoU) on bipartisan cooperation and reforms.
 13 September
 2020-21 Malaysian political crisis
The MoU is signed with six key areas covered in the agreement, and elections not expected before 31 July 2022 at the earliest.

October
 15 October – 1MDB obtained permission from the High Court in Kuala Lumpur to serve its writ of summons against six parties, including two overseas banking firms.
 20 October – A Malaysian is appointed as the first urology professor in the University of Cambridge.

November
 16 November – A Royal Malaysian Air Force Hawk 108 fighter jet crashes, killing one and injuring another.
 17 November – Health Minister Khairy Jamaluddin has assured that he's keeping a close eye on Najib Razak's campaigning in the Malacca polls, after the former prime minister was accused of repeatedly violating Covid-19 standard operating procedures (SOPs).
 18 November – Former prime minister Mahathir Mohamad questioned the RM100 million house to be built for another former prime minister Najib Razak despite the latter's conviction of criminal charges and pending jail sentence. Speaking in the Dewan Rakyat, Mahathir said Najib was a convict who had been found guilty and sentenced to 12 years in jail and fined RM210 million in relation to funds from former 1MDB unit SRC International, but he has not been sent to jail and not paid the fine.
 19 November – Minister in the Prime Minister's Department (Parliament and Law) Wan Junaidi Tuanku Jaafar has revealed that the government had agreed in principle to grant former prime minister Najib Razak his request for land and housing reportedly valued at RM100 million.
 20 November – 15th Malacca state election
 Barisan Nasional retained control of the state by winning 21 seats.
 22 November – Opposition leader Anwar Ibrahim said the cabinet must explain why it had so easily agreed in principle to former prime minister Najib Razak's request for a property valued at RM100 million.
 23 November – Beau Willimon, the creator of the US-version of acclaimed political thriller TV series ‘House of Cards’, is set to create a new series on Jho Low and the 1MDB saga.
 24 November – The Court of Appeal maintained Dec 8 for its decision concerning Najib Razak's appeal to quash his conviction and sentencing in the RM42 million SRC International corruption case.

December
 1 December
The new Kuala Lumpur Air Traffic Control Centre is launched to raise standards in aviation safety and improve capacity for the Kuala Lumpur International Airport.
The Federal Court rules 2–1 that Muslim individuals cannot be a party to a dispute involving a non-Muslim married couple in the civil court, although the law applies to converts.
Prime Minister Ismail Sabri declares 3 December as an annual Malaysia Batik Day.
 2 December – The East Coast Rail link will run through its original Section C alignment in Selangor after the Selangor state government agreed. Agreements are signed to formalise the alignment.
 3 December – Official opening of Pavilion Bukit Jalil in Bukit Jalil, Kuala Lumpur by Malton Group, which had also constructed the Pavilion Kuala Lumpur.
 7 December – The Court of Appeal has sternly reminded former prime minister Najib Razak that it is a court of law and not a coffee shop.
 8 December
The Court of Appeal has upheld the conviction and sentence of former prime minister Najib Razak in the SRC International Sdn Bhd case, where Najib was found guilty of misappropriation RM42mil from the company's coffers.
The Court of Appeal said Najib's alleged receipt of a donation from the Saudi royal family was untenable evidence in his trial for misappropriating RM42 million from SRC International Sdn Bhd.
 10 December – Umno has filed an application for a stay of proceedings in a suit against it by SRC International Sdn Bhd for allegedly receiving a misappropriated sum of RM16 million from the company.
 14 December 
Constitutional amendments restoring Sabah and Sarawak as equal partners with Malaya are passed in Parliament unanimously with 199 in favour, and 21 absent.
The High Court orders Malaysian United Democratic Alliance (MUDA) registered within the next 14 days.
 The Sessions Court in Kuala Lumpur proceeded with the corruption trial involving former Penang chief minister Lim Guan Eng in connection with the Penang undersea tunnel project, although the accused was not in court. Lim's counsel, Gobind Singh Deo, informed the court that his client could not appear in court as he had been admitted to the National Heart Institute (IJN).
 15 December – Laws on allowing people aged 18 and above to vote and automatic voter registration take effect.
 17 December
December 2021 Malaysian floods 
 Klang Valley (Port Klang, Klang, Setia Alam, Puncak Alam, Kota Kemuning, Shah Alam, Kuala Lumpur, Ampang, Cheras, Hulu Langat, Puchong, Dengkil) hit by a worst flash floods ever seen in 50 years due to Tropical Depression 29W. Other reports include Lubok Cina, Kuantan, Bentong, Gua Musang, Kuala Linggi, Seremban, Teluk Intan experienced the flash flood as well.
 18 December – 12th Sarawak state election
 Gabungan Parti Sarawak (formerly Sarawak Barisan Nasional) retained control of the state by winning 76 seats.
 22 December – The Court of Appeal unanimously dismisses the Government's application to suspend giving citizenship to children born overseas to Malaysian mums.
 23 December – Sedenak will be developed as part of Iskandar Malaysia, making that area the sixth flagship zone. It will house agrotechnology, hi-tech, research and development and low-carbon industries.
 31 December – Former health minister Dzulkefly Ahmad has filed a defamation suit against former prime minister Najib Razak following his allegations of nepotism and cronyism. Dzulkefly filed a statement of claim at Kuala Lumpur High Court, providing an August 24, 2020, Facebook post by Najib together with a Sinar Harian article dated January 28, 2019, as key evidence.

Deaths

January 
10 January – Mustaffa Mohammad, former Minister of Social Welfare and Deputy Minister of Works.

February 
3 February – Jamali Shadat, comedian.
3 February – Ismail Kijo, former Member of Selangor State Legislative Assembly for Lembah Jaya.
9 February – Ujang Mormin, World War 2 veteran Private and the last surviving soldier Battle of Pasir Panjang.
11 February – Abu Sujak Mahmud, former Mayor of Shah Alam and Deputy Menteri Besar of Selangor.
13 February – Prof. Dr Hoo Kee Ping, Malaysian economist and educator.

March 
6 March – Abdul Ghani Gilong, former minister and Sabah veteran politician.
15 March – Chai Kim Sen, former Senator.
31 March – Adam Jaafar, fondly known as 'Prebet Adam', an army private who killed 1 person and wounded 2 others in 1987 shooting rampage incident with an M16 rifle in Chow Kit.

April 
30 April – Dr. Md Yusnan Yusof, Member of Kelantan State Legislative Assembly for Melor (2013–2020).

May 
8 May – Low Yow Chuan, a real estate, property developer and patriarch of Low Yat Group.
14 May – Haziq Kamaruddin, sport archer and Olympian.
15 May – Lim Heng Chek, former swimmer and Olympian. 
20 May – Rizuan Abdul Hamid, former Senator and UMNO Deputy Permanent Chairman.
26 May – Ramassuntran Rengan, actor and comedian.
30 May – Harussani Zakaria, Mufti of Perak.

June 
1 June – Lim Kok Wing, founder of Limkokwing University.
1 June – Hsing Yin Shean, former Member of Parliament for Tanjong Aru (1986-1990).
7 June – Abd Rahman Yusof, former Member of Parliament for Kemaman (1999-2004).
10 June – Rajemah Sheikh Ahmad, former Malaysian athlete.
11 June – Husin Din, former Member of Perak State Legislative Assembly for Selinsing.
16 June – K. S. Nijhar, former Member of Parliament for Subang (1999-2008).

July 
7 July – Mohd Ghazali Che Mat, former Chief of Defence Forces.
13 July – Kumutha Raman, Johor DHPP  PAS chief.
18 July – Leong Chee Woh, former Malaysian police.
22 July – Zabariah Abdul Wahab, former Member of Penang State Legislative Assembly for Bertam.

August 
9 August – Siti Sarah, singer and actress.
21 August –  Raja Noor Jan Shah Raja Tuah, businessman and claimant to defunct Sultan of Melaka throne.
24 August – Mohd Ghazali Mohd Seth, former Chief of Defence Forces.
28 August – Ahmad Sarji Abdul Hamid, former Chief Secretary to the Government.
29 August – Lajim Ukin, former Deputy Chief Minister of Sabah, federal Deputy Minister and Member of Parliament for Beaufort.
30 August – Sakaran Dandai, former Yang di-Pertua Negeri of Sabah, Deputy Chief Minister of Sabah and Member of Parliament for Semporna.

September 
10 September – Gapar Gurrohu, former Deputy President of the Dewan Negara.
11 September – Mohd Zaman Khan, former Bukit Aman Criminal Investigation Department (CID) director and Director-General of the Prisons Department (1994–1997).
19 September – Nilwan Kabang, former Member of the Sabah State Legislative Assembly for Kunak.

October 
3 October – Zolkples Embong, former National Sports Council (NSC) director-general.
24 October – Mamat Khalid, screenwriter and film director.
26 October – Guan Dee Koh Hoi, Deputy Minister of Tourism, Arts and Culture (April 2020 – August 2021) and Secretary-General of the Homeland Solidarity Party.
27 October – Ahmad Kamal Abdullah (Kemala), Malaysian National Laureate.
31 October – James Jemut Masing, Sarawak Deputy Chief Minister and Member of the Sarawak State Legislative Assembly for Baleh.

November 
5 November – Muslifah Zulkifli, former national woman sports shooter.
17 November – Abdul Ghafar Atan, former Member of Malacca State Legislative Assembly for Gadek (2004–2013) and Asahan (2013–2021).

December 
4 December – Sabbaruddin Chik, former Minister of Culture, Arts and Tourism.
21 December – Osman Sapian, former Menteri Besar of Johor.

Sports

2020 Olympics - Tokyo 
 Cycling Track - Men's Keirin
Mohd Azizulhasni Awang won a Silver medal.
 Badminton - Men's Doubles
Wooi Yik Soh and Aaron Chia won a Bronze medal.

2020 Paralympics - Tokyo 
Malaysia managed to achieve this target with three gold medals in the 2020 Summer Paralympics.
 Powerlifting - Men's 72 kg
Bonnie Bunyau Gustin 
 Badminton - Men's Singles SU5
Cheah Liek Hou
  Athletics - Men's Long jump T20
Abdul Latif Romly

References

 
2020s in Malaysia
Malaysia
Years of the 21st century in Malaysia
Malaysia